Kenneth Edward Mellons (born July 10, 1965) is an American country music artist who released his self-titled debut album in 1994. This album produced the single "Jukebox Junkie", a Top Ten hit on the Hot Country Songs charts. Mellons followed up his debut album with three more albums – 1995's Where Forever Begins, 2001's The Best of Ken Mellons and 2004's Sweet — in addition to charting six more singles on the country charts.

Biography
Mellons was born in Kingsport, Tennessee. He has been a native of Nashville, Tennessee since the age of three. He entered in many talent shows in high school, and played at various clubs around Nashville to help perfect his skill, while working day jobs to pay the bills. In 1989, Ken earned a spot at a show called Country Music USA at Opryland USA, a theme park in Nashville. Later, he was signed to Epic Records in 1993. His debut, self-titled album produced a Top 10 single in "Jukebox Junkie", a song which also received ASCAP and BMI awards for surpassing one million spins on radio. His second album, Where Forever Begins, failed to produce any successful singles, and by 1997, Mellons left Epic Records.

Shortly after leaving Epic, Mellons signed to Curb Records. He released two non-charting singles and one album (The Best of Ken Mellons) during his six-year tenure with Curb. He became frustrated with the label and asked out of his record deal with them in 2003. Mellons then moved to the independent Home Records, releasing the album Sweet in 2004. The album featured "Paint Me a Birmingham", which became a Top 5 country hit for Tracy Lawrence in the first half of 2004. Mellons also co-wrote the songs "Honk If You Honky Tonk" on George Strait's "Honkytonkville" album and "I Bought The Shoes" on Dierks Bentley's self-titled debut album.

Mellons continues to perform throughout the US and recorded a bluegrass album titled Rural Route in 2009.

Discography

Albums

Singles

Music videos

References

1965 births
Living people
People from Kingsport, Tennessee
American male singer-songwriters
American country singer-songwriters
Curb Records artists
Epic Records artists
Singer-songwriters from Tennessee
Country musicians from Tennessee